The Canadian Judicial Council (CJC) is the national council of the judiciary of Canada, overseeing the country's federal judges.

The Council has 41 members, composed of chief justices and associate chief justices. It is chaired by the Chief Justice of Canada, currently Justice Richard Wagner.

History 
The council was created in 1971 by the Parliament of Canada following years of discussion about the need to coordinate professional development and judicial conduct matters for judges, in a way that would respect the judiciary as an independent branch of government. The review of complaints had previously usually been coordinated by the Department of Justice, with the occasional involvement of local Chief Justices.

Landreville case 
A key factor that facilitated the creation of the council was the case of justice Leo Landreville. He was charged with a criminal offence. Those charges were dismissed, but allegations of impropriety continued to be made by some. This gave rise to quite a bit of public debate; some in the legal profession criticized the fact that the judge was still sitting. A Committee of the Law Society, despite not having jurisdiction over a federally appointed judge, produced a negative report without even notifying Landreville of its proceedings.

There being no defined process to formally inquire into the conduct of a judge, the government then constituted a one-man Royal Commission headed by former Supreme Court Justice Ivan Rand. In his report, Rand found some improprieties and was critical of Justice Landreville. However, some said Mr Rand was biased and famous constitutional lawyer J.J. Robinette who represented Justice Landreville before the Commission was seriously critical of the process.

After the Rand report became public, a joint Committee of Parliament eventually recommended the judge's removal and he resigned.

There were many who came to a view that the process which had been followed was flawed: the absence of a process defined in legislation to review the conduct of a judge left too much room for review by the law societies, government or Parliament, of even other bodies without necessarily involving the judiciary.

Professor William Kaplan, in his book Bad Judgment, wrote that "[w]ithout a doubt, the Landreville case figured prominently in the decision to establish the council." He quotes the Parliamentary Secretary to the Minister of Justice who spoke during second reading of the Bill that created the Council: "Because the independence of the judiciary is an integral part of the Canadian democratic process, it is important that the judiciary become, to some extent, a self-disciplinary body."

According to Martin Friedland, "There is no doubt that the awkwardness and uncertainty of the Landreville proceeding was a factor motivating Parliament to adopt this new procedure."

Organization and activities 
The CJC's activities have been characterized as seeking to investigate complaints about judicial misbehaviour and on the other hand protecting the reputation of judges against unfounded accusations.

Members 
The Council has 41 members, composed of chief justices and associate chief justices. It is chaired by the Chief Justice of the Supreme Court of Canada, currently Justice Richard Wagner.

Review of Complaints
The Canadian Judicial Council was granted power under the Judges Act to investigate complaints made by members of the public or the Attorney General about the conduct of federally appointed judges. After its review and investigation of a complaint, the Council can make recommendations to Parliament through the Minister of Justice that a judge be removed from office.

Canada is one of the very few countries where a complaint can be made against the Chief Justice in the same way as any other judge. The Chief Justice is not involved in the review of complaints.

List of public inquiries
While the majority of complaints are dealt with quickly and without a public hearing, there are some instances where a judge's conduct is considered to be of sufficient concern that further inquiry is warranted.

Since its inception in 1971, the CJC has referred a total of 14 complaints (one involving three judges) to an inquiry committee:

Criticisms

Limited removals 
In its 40-year history, the CJC has only ordered 11 public inquiries and only twice recommended that a judge be removed from the bench. In the 145 years since Confederation, only five superior court judges have been recommended for removal from the bench. All but one resigned before being removed.

The CJC has declined to recommend removal even in cases where there was a finding of inappropriate conduct. In 2008, a CJC inquiry panel recommended removing Ontario Superior Court Justice Theodore Matlow from the bench, but a majority of the full CJC overruled the removal recommendation despite agreeing there was misconduct. Rocco Galati criticized the difficulty of removing judges, saying that "it's easier to get a constitutional amendment than to remove a judge."

After a full panel of the CJC ignored its committee recommendation and recommended that Quebec judge Michel Girouard should remain on the bench, federal Justice Minister Jody Wilson-Raybould and Quebec Justice Minister Stéphanie Vallée ordered the CJC to reconsider its decision.

The CJC has said that misconduct should not guarantee the judge's removal, and the gravity of the misconduct must be determined. Osgoode Hall Law School professor Trevor Farrow said that the rarity of removals reflects the high value that is placed on independence for judges in Canada.

Makeup of CJC 
The CJC is composed only of judges. Galati criticized the makeup of the CJC, pointing out that judges are the only truly self-regulating profession in Canada, and has urged public participation in the process. Osgoode Hall Law School professor Allan Hutchison argued that the CJC should include members of the public, and criticized the hypocrisy of judges calling for natural justice in other professions. University of Calgary Faculty of Law professor and Canadian Association for Legal Ethics president Alice Wooley said including laypersons in the CJC would ensure that the process is less insular and more transparent.

Secrecy 
In September 2003, the Canadian Justice Review Board, a non-governmental advocacy group and "coalition of citizens," expressed concern that the CJC is too secretive. Wooley criticized the CJC for not clearly articulating what constituted misconduct worthy of sanctions.

Range of sanctions 
Some critics have pointed out that the only available sanction of removal may not be appropriate in some circumstances.

References

External links

National councils of the judiciary
Legal organizations based in Canada
Legal history of Canada
1971 establishments in Canada
Organizations established in 1971
1971 in Canadian law